Robb Alvey (born Robert Lee) is an American roller coaster reviewer and video game producer. Alvey has ridden over 1400 coasters around the world, and has documented his travels and those of others on his website Theme Park Review. He has been featured on related documentaries for Discovery Channel, Travel Channel, and TLC.

Career

Alvey is best known as a roller coaster reviewer and aficionado. His Theme Park Review website was started in 1996 and became a site for coaster videos, photos, forums, and information about theme parks and roller coasters. As of 2012, the website sees over 2 million visitors a year and has more than 35,000 registered members. After the popularity of his website increased, a number of people indicated they wished to be involved in his theme park tours, so he began selling tickets for fans to accompany him. These tours were organized by Alvey through his website and span multiple theme parks across the United States and internationally, such as the Middle America Tour in August 2010, where seventeen theme parks were attended over the course of fifteen days, and a 40-person world tour that included Aussie World in Australia. He is also a member of the American Coaster Enthusiasts organization.

He has also worked as a video game producer on a number of games including the remake A Boy and His Blob and Call of Duty: United Offensive. Companies he has worked with include MGM Interactive, WayForward Technologies, Take-Two Interactive, and Gray Matter Studios.

He has been featured in the television series Insane Coaster Wars as a roller coaster "expert".

He currently lives in Orlando, Florida.

Filmography/games

References

Further reading

External links 
  
 
 Official Youtube Channel
Robb Alvey on Moby Games

Living people
Writers from California
Roller coasters
American video game producers
Year of birth missing (living people)
YouTubers from California